Charles MacWilliam (January 10, 1903 – September 30, 1975) was an American wrestler. He competed in the freestyle bantamweight event at the 1924 Summer Olympics.

References

External links
 

1903 births
1975 deaths
Olympic wrestlers of the United States
Wrestlers at the 1924 Summer Olympics
American male sport wrestlers
Sportspeople from Perth Amboy, New Jersey
20th-century American people